State complexity is an area of theoretical computer science
dealing with the size of abstract automata,
such as different kinds of finite automata.
The classical result in the area is that
simulating an -state
nondeterministic finite automaton
by a deterministic finite automaton
requires exactly  states in the worst case.

Transformation between variants of finite automata

Finite automata can be
deterministic and
nondeterministic,
one-way (DFA, NFA)
and two-way
(2DFA, 2NFA).
Other related classes are
unambiguous (UFA),
self-verifying (SVFA)
and alternating (AFA) finite automata.
These automata can also be two-way (2UFA, 2SVFA, 2AFA).

All these machines can accept exactly the regular languages.
However, the size of different types of automata
necessary to accept the same language
(measured in the number of their states)
may be different.
For any two types of finite automata,
the state complexity tradeoff between them
is an integer function 
where  is the least number of states in automata of the second type
sufficient to recognize every language
recognized by an -state automaton of the first type.
The following results are known.

 NFA to DFA:  states. This is the subset construction by Rabin and Scott, proved optimal by Lupanov.

 UFA to DFA:  states, see Leung, An earlier lower bound by Schmidt was smaller.
 NFA to UFA:  states, see Leung. There was an earlier smaller lower bound by Schmidt.
 SVFA to DFA:  states, see Jirásková and Pighizzini
 2DFA to DFA:  states, see Kapoutsis. Earlier construction by Shepherdson used more states, and an earlier lower bound by Moore was smaller.
 2DFA to NFA: , see Kapoutsis. Earlier construction by Birget used more states.
 2NFA to NFA: , see Kapoutsis.
 2NFA to NFA accepting the complement:  states, see Vardi.
 AFA to DFA:  states, see Chandra, Kozen and Stockmeyer.
 AFA to NFA:  states, see Fellah, Jürgensen and Yu.
 2AFA to DFA: , see Ladner, Lipton and Stockmeyer.
 2AFA to NFA: , see Geffert and Okhotin.

The 2DFA vs. 2NFA problem and logarithmic space

It is an open problem whether all 2NFAs can be converted to 2DFAs
with polynomially many states, i.e. whether there is a polynomial 
such that for every -state 2NFA
there exists a -state 2DFA.
The problem was raised by Sakoda and Sipser,
who compared it to the P vs. NP problem 
in the computational complexity theory.
Berman and Lingas discovered a formal relation between this problem
and the L vs. NL open problem.
This relation was further elaborated by Kapoutsis.

State complexity of operations for finite automata

Given a binary regularity-preserving operation on languages 
and a family of automata X (DFA, NFA, etc.),
the state complexity of 
is an integer function  such that

 for all integers m, n there is an m-state X-automaton A and an n-state X-automaton B such that every X-automaton for  must have at least  states.

Analogous definition applies for operations with any number of arguments.

The first results on state complexity of operations for DFAs
were published by Maslov

and by Yu, Zhuang and Salomaa.

Holzer and Kutrib

pioneered the state complexity of operations on NFA.
The known results for basic operations are listed below.

Union

If language  requires m states
and language  requires n states,
how many states does  require?

 DFA:  states, see Maslov and Yu, Zhuang and Salomaa.
 NFA:  states, see Holzer and Kutrib.
 SVFA:  states, see Jirásek, Jirásková and Szabari.
 2NFA:  states, see Kunc and Okhotin.

Intersection

How many states does  require?

 DFA:  states, see Maslov and Yu, Zhuang and Salomaa.
 NFA:  states, see Holzer and Kutrib.
 UFA:  states, see Jirásek, Jirásková and Šebej.
 SVFA:  states, see Jirásek, Jirásková and Szabari.

Complementation

If language L requires n states
then how many states does its complement require?

 DFA:  states, by exchanging accepting and rejecting states.
 NFA:  states, see Birget.
 UFA: at least  states, see Göös, Kiefer and Yuan, and at most  states, see Indzhev and Kiefer.
 SVFA:  states, by exchanging accepting and rejecting states.
 2DFA: at least  and at most  states, see Geffert, Mereghetti and Pighizzini.

Concatenation

How many states does  require?

 DFA:  states, see Maslov  and Yu, Zhuang and Salomaa.
 NFA:  states, see Holzer and Kutrib.
 UFA:  states, see Jirásek, Jirásková and Šebej.
 SVFA:  states, see Jirásek, Jirásková and Szabari.
 2DFA:	at least  and at most  states, see Jirásková and Okhotin.

Kleene star

 DFA:  states, see Maslov and Yu, Zhuang and Salomaa.
 NFA:  states, see Holzer and Kutrib.
 UFA:  states, see Jirásek, Jirásková and Šebej.
 SVFA:  states, see Jirásek, Jirásková and Szabari.
 2DFA:	at least  and at most  states, see Jirásková and Okhotin.

Reversal

 DFA:  states, see Mirkin, Leiss, and Yu, Zhuang and Salomaa.
 NFA:  states, see Holzer and Kutrib.
 UFA:  states.
 SVFA:  states, see Jirásek, Jirásková and Szabari.

Finite automata over a unary alphabet

State complexity of finite automata with a one-letter (unary) alphabet, pioneered by Chrobak, is different from the multi-letter case.

Let  be Landau's function.

Transformation between models

For a one-letter alphabet, transformations between different types of finite automata are sometimes more efficient than in the general case.

 NFA to DFA:  states, see Chrobak.
 2DFA to DFA:  states, see Chrobak and Kunc and Okhotin.
 2NFA to DFA:  states, see Mereghetti and Pighizzini. and Geffert, Mereghetti and Pighizzini.
 NFA to 2DFA: at most  states, see Chrobak.
 2NFA to 2DFA: at most  states, proved by implementing the method of Savitch's theorem, see Geffert, Mereghetti and Pighizzini.
 UFA to DFA: , see Okhotin.
 NFA to UFA: , see Okhotin.

Union

 DFA:  states, see Yu, Zhuang and Salomaa.
 NFA:  states, see Holzer and Kutrib.
 2NFA:  states, see Kunc and Okhotin.

Intersection

 DFA:  states, see Yu, Zhuang and Salomaa.
 NFA:  states, see Holzer and Kutrib.

Complementation

 DFA:  states.
 NFA:  states, see Holzer and Kutrib.
 UFA: at least  states, see Raskin, and at most  states, see Okhotin.
 2DFA: at least  and at most  states, see Kunc and Okhotin.
 2NFA: at least  and at most  states. The upper bound is by implementing the method of the Immerman–Szelepcsényi theorem, see Geffert, Mereghetti and Pighizzini.

Concatenation

 DFA:  states, see Yu, Zhuang and Salomaa.
 2DFA:	 states, see Kunc and Okhotin.
 2NFA:	 states, see Kunc and Okhotin.

Kleene star

 DFA:  states, see Yu, Zhuang and Salomaa.
 NFA:  states, see Holzer and Kutrib.
 UFA:  states, see Okhotin.
 2DFA:	 states, see Kunc and Okhotin.
 2NFA:	 states, see Kunc and Okhotin.

Further reading

Surveys of state complexity
were written by Holzer and Kutrib
and by Gao et al.

New research on state complexity
is commonly presented at the annual workshops on
Descriptional Complexity of Formal Systems (DCFS),
at the 
Conference on Implementation and Application of Automata (CIAA),
and at various conferences on theoretical computer science in general.

References 

Finite automata